André Raphel is an American conductor. He is Conductor Laureate of the Wheeling Symphony Orchestra, having served as Music Director from 2003-2018.

Early life and education
Born André Raphel Smith in Durham, North Carolina, he began formal music lessons at age 11. He received a Bachelor of Music degree from the University of Miami, and pursued further study at Yale University where he earned his Master's Degree. While at Yale University, he studied conducting with Otto-Werner Mueller. He continued studies with Mueller at the Curtis Institute of Music earning a diploma in conducting, and at the Juilliard School of Music where he received an Advanced Certificate in orchestral conducting.

Career
André Raphel began his career as music director of the Norwalk Youth Symphony (1990). He was assistant conductor of the Saint Louis Symphony Orchestra (1991–1994), where he worked with Leonard Slatkin.  He was assistant conductor of The Philadelphia Orchestra (1994–2000), working with Wolfgang Sawallisch. He also served as an assistant conductor to Kurt Masur at the New York Philharmonic (2000–2002).

For fifteen years he served as music director at the Wheeling Symphony Orchestra.(2003-2018) He is currently Conductor Laureate of the Wheeling Symphony Orchestra (2018).

He has appeared as guest conductor with major orchestras in North America including the Boston Symphony Orchestra, Chicago Symphony Orchestra, the Cleveland Orchestra, New York Philharmonic, Philadelphia Orchestra; and in Europe with Bamberger Symphoniker, Moravska Philharmonie and Neubrandenburger Philharmonie.

Honors 
 Distinguished Alumnus Award; University of Miami Frost School of Music, 2012
 Distinguished Service Award; Yale University, 2006
 Honorary Doctorate; West Liberty University, 2004
 Order of the Long Leaf Pine; North Carolina Senate, 2001

Recordings 
Gershwin: Cuban Overture, Ravel: Ma Mere l'Oye, Roy Harris: Third Symphony, Bamberger Symphoniker
Music of Barber, Danielpour and Respighi; for Bayerischer Rundfunk, Bamberger Symphoniker
"Honoring the Dream" William Grant Still: Symphony No.1, The Philadelphia Orchestra

References 
 Phillip Nones, May 21, 2016.  Important new American piano concerto premiere in Wheeling Bachtrack
 Elaine Mack, November 2009. "Black Classical Musicians in Philadelphia"  p. 343-347
 Peter G. Davis, March 1997. American Classics New York Magazine

References

External links 
 

Living people
American male conductors (music)
Musicians from Durham, North Carolina
University of Miami Frost School of Music alumni
Yale School of Music alumni
Curtis Institute of Music alumni
21st-century American conductors (music)
21st-century American male musicians
Year of birth missing (living people)